Groot is the name of two fictional characters voiced by Vin Diesel and portrayed via motion capture by Diesel, Krystian Godlewski, Sean Gunn, James Gunn, and Terry Notary, in the Marvel Cinematic Universe (MCU) media franchise, based on the Marvel Comics character of the same name. Both Groots are depicted as tree-like humanoids, with the original being Rocket's associate, and the second becoming his adoptive son. Both are members of the Guardians of the Galaxy.

In March 2017, Gunn confirmed that the character Baby Groot introduced at the conclusion of Guardians of the Galaxy (2014) following the original Groot's death and adopted by Rocket as his son is a different character from the first Groot, who does not have his biological father's memories.

, the original Groot appeared in one film, the other in five, the television special The Guardians of the Galaxy Holiday Special, and the animated series of shorts called I Am Groot (2022) released on Disney+. He will return in Guardians of the Galaxy Vol. 3 (2023).

Conception and creation
Groot first appeared in Tales to Astonish #13 (November 1960), and was created by Stan Lee, Larry Lieber and Jack Kirby. "Groot" is the Dutch word for "large", possibly referring to his stature and ability to grow in size. He appeared again in The Incredible Hulk Annual #5 (Oct. 1976), alongside five other monsters from Marvel's anthology horror comics of the late 1950s and early 1960s. In The Sensational Spider-Man #−1 (July 1997), Groot was featured in a nightmare of the young Peter Parker. Groot reappeared in 2006 in the six-issue limited series Nick Fury's Howling Commandos, and appeared in the Annihilation: Conquest and Annihilation: Conquest – Star-Lord limited series. Groot went on to join the Guardians of the Galaxy in the series of the same name, and remained a fixture of the title until its cancellation with issue #25 in 2010.

Marvel Studios President Kevin Feige first mentioned Guardians of the Galaxy as a potential film at the 2010 San Diego Comic-Con International, stating, "There are some obscure titles, too, like Guardians of the Galaxy. I think they've been revamped recently in a fun way in the [comic] book." Feige reiterated that sentiment in a September 2011 issue of Entertainment Weekly, saying, "There's an opportunity to do a big space epic, which Thor sort of hints at, in the cosmic side" of the Marvel Cinematic Universe. Feige added, should the film be made, it would feature an ensemble of characters, similar to X-Men and The Avengers. Feige announced that the film was in active development at the 2012 San Diego Comic-Con International during the Marvel Studios panel, with an intended release date of August 1, 2014. He said the film's titular team would consist of the characters Star-Lord, Drax the Destroyer, Gamora, Groot, and Rocket.

In September 2013, Vin Diesel stated that he was voicing Groot, though Marvel did not confirm Diesel's involvement in the film at the time.

Fictional character biography

Adult Groot

Guardian of the Galaxy

A sentient tree-like being, Groot becomes associated with the raccoon-like mercenary Rocket. In 2014, on the planet Xandar, they spot Peter Quill fighting Gamora for possession of the Power Stone. Rocket and Groot interfere in their fight, as they attempt to capture Quill for a bounty. All four are captured by the Nova Corps and sent to the Kyln, a space prison. Rocket devises an intricate plan to escape from the Kyln, which involves a battery taken from a device from high up on the wall as the last step due to its connection to an alarm. However, Groot, innocently meaning to help, extends himself to a great height and takes the device, triggering alarms and forcing the rest to accelerate the plan. They escape along with Kyln inmate Drax, and the five become the Guardians of the Galaxy. They travel to Knowhere to sell the Power Stone, where Rocket and Drax have a heated argument resulting in a bar fight between Drax and Groot. After Drax drunkenly calls his powerful enemy Ronan to confront him, Ronan arrives and easily beats Drax and acquires the Power Stone, tossing Drax into a vat of spinal fluid from the mining operations on Knowhere. Groot rescues Drax from drowning, and while Rocket wants to flee, he is convinced by Groot and by Drax's apology to help save Xandar from Ronan's attack.

Death and birth of son
As Groot and the Guardians battle Ronan the Accuser aboard the Dark Aster, Rocket crashes a Ravager ship through the control room of the Dark Aster, causing it to crash-land on Xandar. Before impact, Groot sacrifices himself to shield Rocket and the others by extending his body to form a cocoon, taking the brunt of the impact. On Xandar, the remaining Guardians are able to regain control of the Power Stone and destroy Ronan. Rocket plants a sapling taken from Groot's scattered body, which grows into a baby of his species, whom Rocket names Groot in his biological father's honour.

Groot II

Birth and facing Ego

Following the death of his father, "Baby Groot" is grown from a sapling cut from him in a pot, and raised by Rocket as his son on Peter Quill's ship as a member of the Guardians of the Galaxy. Groot develops a love of music and dances while listening to Quill's music. Sometime later, Baby Groot struggles to take his first steps when his pot is cracked.

Two months later, the Guardians of the Galaxy are hired by the Sovereign to protect valuable batteries from an inter-dimensional monster. Baby Groot accompanies them, but rather than fighting the monster, he picks fights with rat-like reptiles in the area. When Quill's father Ego reveals himself to the Guardians, they split up so that Quill, Gamora, and Drax can go with Ego to his planet while Rocket and Groot stay behind to watch Nebula and repair the ship. However, the Ravagers arrive searching for Quill and after a fight, they capture Rocket and Groot and free Nebula. The Ravagers mutiny against their leader, Yondu, and mistreat Groot, with one Ravager pouring drinks on him and stomping on him. After the Ravagers fall asleep, Rocket and Yondu plot their escape, and Groot tries to find Yondu's fin. Eventually, Groot kills the Ravager who had tormented him and they destroy most of the Ravager vessel except for a breakaway quarter, in which they travel to Ego's planet. They learn that Ego is an evil living planet intent on dominating the universe. Quill keeps Ego occupied in combat with his newfound Celestial powers until Rocket is able to assemble a bomb, which Baby Groot places in Ego's brain.

Misadventures in space 

Baby Groot encountered the Grunds alien species, who believe he is their hero when Groot farts a leaf. When Groot returns from retrieving additional leaves, he accidentally steps on the Grunds. He also encounters Iwua, a space-shifting alien who impersonates him in a dance off, but Groot kills him via opening the airlock. Sometime later, Groot takes a bath and uses his leaves to form multiple "costumes", and skins a squirrel-bird creature that mocked him. Baby Groot sets out to retrieve tools to paint the Guardians of the Galaxy; which he shows to Rocket, whom he saves from an explosion.

Infinity War and resurrection 

In 2018, an older, video game-addicted teenage Groot and the rest of the Guardians respond to a distress signal and end up rescuing Thor, who is floating in space amidst the wreckage of the Statesman. Thor tells them of Thanos' plan to obtain the Infinity Stones, and the Guardians split up, with Rocket and Groot accompanying Thor to Nidavellir to create a new weapon. They find an abandoned Nidavellir and meet the dwarf king Eitri. The four work together to create Stormbreaker, a powerful axe that also grants Thor the power of the Bifröst. Thor is near death from the strain of creating the weapon, and Groot uses his own arm as a handle to finish the axe and heal Thor. Thor transports himself, Rocket, and Groot to Wakanda on Earth via the Bifröst to help the Avengers and the Wakandan army in the battle against the Outriders. Despite being severely wounded, Thanos is able to activate the Infinity Gauntlet, snap his fingers, and teleports away. Rocket watches helplessly as Groot dissolves into dust alongside half of all living things in the universe. Groot uttered one final "I am Groot," which director James Gunn revealed translated to "...Dad?" as he looked to Rocket for help.

In 2023, after the surviving Avengers travel back in time to obtain past versions of the stones to resurrect those who had been victims of the Blip, Groot is restored and reunites with Rocket in battling the forces of an alternate 2014 version of Thanos. Later, Groot and the restored members of the Guardians of the Galaxy attend the funeral of Tony Stark, who had sacrificed his life to stop Thanos. Groot and the rest of the Guardians, accompanied by Thor, then return to space.

Adventures in space

The Guardians returned to their adventures in space. On Indigarr, the team learns of distress calls as gods were being killed, and they split off from Thor to answer various distress calls across the galaxy.

In 2025, the Guardians buy Knowhere and Groot, now bulky and bigger, helps rebuild it following the attack it had faced. Later that year, he joins in the Christmas celebrations.

Characterization

Adult Groot
Groot is first introduced as Rocket's partner appearing in the film Guardians of the Galaxy. He has a limited vocabulary, using only his popular catchphrase "I am Groot", although he later managed to say the phrase "We are Groot" before sacrificing his life for the Guardians of the Galaxy in the battle with Ronan for an infinity stone. Other Groot characteristics include the ability to grow his branches in height, length, and girth (assimilating arms and legs), vining branches, growing flowers and producing a form of luminescent seeds.

A tree-like humanoid, he is the accomplice of Rocket. Diesel stated that he provided the voice and motion capture for Groot, after originally being in talks to star in a new Phase Three Marvel film. Diesel also provided Groot's voice for several foreign-language releases of the film. Krystian Godlewski portrayed the character on set, though his acting was not used in the final character CGI. On the character, which Gunn based on his dog, Gunn said, "All the Guardians start out the movie as bastards—except Groot. He's an innocent. He's a hundred percent deadly and a hundred percent sweet. He's caught up in Rocket's life, really." Gunn added that the design and movement of Groot took "the better part of a year" to create. Gunn added, "The ways in which Vin Diesel says, 'I am Groot,' I am astounded. All of the 'I am Groots' that were earlier voices didn't sound very good at all ... Vin came in and in one day, laid down all these 'I am Groot' tracks, and he's a perfectionist. He made me explain to him with ever  'I am Groot,' exactly what he was saying ... It was amazing when we first put that voice in there how much the character changed and how much he influenced the character." Regarding the limited words used by Groot, Diesel said in many ways this was, "... the most challenging thing to ask an actor to do." Diesel found an emotional note in his performance, invoking the death of his friend and Fast & Furious co-star Paul Walker, saying, "This was in December [2013], and the first time I came back to dealing with human beings after dealing with death, so playing a character who celebrates life in the way Groot does was very nice." Groot's form and size-changing abilities are seen, with Gunn stating that he has the ability to grow in the film.

The mature Groot appears to be nearly indestructible, as seen when his limbs are chopped off and by his ability to thicken his branches into a protective mass that's impenetrable by bullets. He serves as a friend, shield and protector of Rocket and his fellow Guardian friends.

Young Groot
Following adult Groot's death in the crashing of Ronan's spaceship, Rocket recovered and planted pieces of his branches in a flower pot which grew into his son, Baby Groot, whom Rocket raises and is later seen as teenage Groot. The character began growing from a sapling at the end of the first film, with James Gunn intending for him to be fully grown by the sequel. Gunn eventually decided to keep him as "Baby Groot", which was one of the reasons the film is set only a few months after the first. Gunn described Baby Groot as the son of Groot from the first film, with Diesel explaining that "we're going to see this goofy, adorable, baby Groot [just] kinda learning as he goes." Prop master Russell Bobbitt created a 1:1 scale model of the  Baby Groot for filming, to use as a lighting reference and sometimes as a puppet for the actors to interact with. As Groot only communicates with the phrase "I am Groot" in different inflections, Gunn created a "Groot Version" of the script for himself and Diesel, which contains each of Groot's lines in English. Diesel used a higher register of his voice for Baby Groot, which was pitched up by seven to nine semitones depending on the take. He also delivered lines slowly to avoid any time stretching issues. Diesel recorded Groot's voice for sixteen foreign-language releases of the film (up from six in the first film). Sean Gunn provided on-set reference for adolescent Groot in the post-credit sequence.

Reception 

Jacob Stolworthy of The Independent praised the character, opining that Groot was "one of the best things about the first Guardians of the Galaxy film, and his camaraderie with Rocket Raccoon [was] a highlight". However, Stolworthy also criticized the subsequent depiction of the character as a baby as "extremely annoying". Peter Bradshaw of The Guardian, meanwhile, praised the character, likening Groot to "a huge Tolkienian creature".

Following the premiere of Guardians of the Galaxy, Vin Diesel and Bradley Cooper, who voices Rocket, were nominated in the "Best Duo" category at the 2015 MTV Movie Awards. The character has also been the subject of numerous memes on social media. Media outlets expressed excitement at seeing the bigger, bulkier Groot who appeared in The Guardians of the Galaxy Holiday Special.

In other media 
Vin Diesel reprises his role as Baby Groot in the 2018 film Ralph Breaks the Internet. He is seen in the Oh My Disney world of the Internet answering questions from fans, including his possible connection to Yggdrasil, his relationship with Drax, and what kind of Tree he is. However, as with his vocabulary, the only answer he is able to give is "I am Groot".

See also 
 Characters of the Marvel Cinematic Universe

Notes

References

External links 
 Groot on the Marvel Cinematic Universe Wiki
 
 Groot on Marvel.com

Avengers (film series)
Animated characters in film
Fictional characters displaced in time
Fictional characters who can stretch themselves
Fictional characters with superhuman durability or invulnerability
Fictional characters with plant abilities
Fictional mercenaries
Fictional outlaws
Fictional prison escapees
Fictional trees
Film characters introduced in 2014
Guardians of the Galaxy (film series)
Guardians of the Galaxy characters
Male characters in film
Marvel Cinematic Universe characters
Marvel Comics characters with accelerated healing
Marvel Comics characters with superhuman strength
Marvel Comics extraterrestrial superheroes
Marvel Comics male superheroes
Marvel Comics plant characters
Space pirates